Gunpo Station is a station on the Seoul Subway Line 1. It serves the city of Gunpo in Gyeonggi-do, South Korea. The name of the station is derived from the local name.

References

External links
 Station information from Korail

Seoul Metropolitan Subway stations
Metro stations in Gunpo
Railway stations in Korea opened in 1905